Alishervan Rural District is a rural district (dehestan) in the Sirvan District of Ilam County, Ilam Province, Iran. At the 2006 census, its population was 4,812, in 952 families.  The rural district has 6 villages.  The rural District was established on March 9, 2013.

References 

Rural Districts of Ilam Province
Ilam County